La quema de Judas is a 1974 Venezuelan drama film directed by Román Chalbaud. It was entered into the 9th Moscow International Film Festival.

Cast
 Miguel Ángel Landa (as Miguelángel Landa)
 Claudio Brook
 María Teresa Acosta
 Hilda Vera
 Arturo Calderón
 William Moreno
 Rafael Briceño
 Eladio Lares

See also 
 Burning of Judas

References

External links
 

1974 films
1974 drama films
Venezuelan drama films
1970s Spanish-language films
Films directed by Román Chalbaud